The S35 district lies within in the City of Sheffield, South Yorkshire, England.  The district contains 70 listed buildings that are recorded in the National Heritage List for England.  Of these, one is listed at Grade I, the highest of the three grades, four are at Grade II*, the middle grade, and the others are at Grade II, the lowest grade.  The district is in the north east of the city of Sheffield, and covers the areas of Brightholmlee, Burncross, Chapeltown, Ecclesfield, Grenoside, High Green, Onesacre, Oughtibridge, Wharncliffe Side, Whitley and Worrall, plus part of Middlewood.  The listed buildings consist of 

For neighbouring areas, see listed buildings in S5, listed buildings in S6, listed buildings in Rotherham (Keppel Ward), listed buildings in Stocksbridge, listed buildings in Tankersley, listed buildings in Wentworth, and listed buildings in Wortley.



Key

Buildings

References 

 - A list of all the listed buildings within Sheffield City Council's boundary is available to download from this page.

Sources

 S35
Sheffield S35